24 Hours a Day or Twenty-Four Hours a Day may refer to:

 Twenty-Four Hours A Day, a 1954 book by Richmond Walker
 24 Hours a Day, a 1997 album by The Bottle Rockets
 "Gotta Find Me a Lover (24 Hours a Day)", a 1969 song by Erma Franklin
 "24 Hours a Day", a 1976 song by Triumph

See also
 24 Hours (disambiguation)